John Henry Pennington (24 June 1881 – 2 January 1942) was an English first-class cricketer active 1902–05 who played for Nottinghamshire. He was born in Sutton-on-Trent; died in Newark, Nottinghamshire.

References

1881 births
1942 deaths
English cricketers
Nottinghamshire cricketers
People from Sutton-on-Trent
Cricketers from Nottinghamshire